Leonardo Pablo Cauteruchi (born May 4, 1973 in Mar del Plata (Buenos Aires), Argentina) is an Argentine former football goalkeeper who played for clubs in Argentina and Chile.

Teams
  Platense 1993-1994
  Atlanta 1994-1996
  Aldosivi de Mar del Plata 1996-1998
  Palestino 1999-2002
  Universidad Católica 2003-2004
  Deportes Concepción 2005
  Santiago Morning 2006
  Olimpo de Bahía Blanca 2006-2010

References

External links
 
 

1973 births
Living people
Argentine footballers
Argentine expatriate footballers
Club Atlético Platense footballers
Club Atlético Atlanta footballers
Aldosivi footballers
Olimpo footballers
Club Deportivo Palestino footballers
Club Deportivo Universidad Católica footballers
Deportes Concepción (Chile) footballers
Santiago Morning footballers
Chilean Primera División players
Argentine Primera División players
Expatriate footballers in Chile
Association football goalkeepers
Sportspeople from Mar del Plata